Trinidad and Tobago competed at the 1968 Summer Olympics in Mexico City, Mexico. 19 competitors, all men, took part in 14 events in 5 sports.

Athletics

Men's 100 metres
 Ronald Monsegue
 Round 1 — 10.5 seconds (→ 5th in heat, did not advance)

Men's 200 metres
 Edwin Roberts
 Round 1 — 20.6 seconds (→ 4th in heat, advanced to round 2)
 Round 2 — 20.4 seconds (→ 2nd in heat, advanced to semi final)
 Semi final — 20.4 seconds (→ 2nd in heat, advanced to final)
 Final — 20.3 seconds (→ 4th place)
 Winston Short
 Round 1 — 20.9 seconds (→ 2nd in heat, advanced to round 2)
 Round 2 — 21.5 seconds (→ 7th in heat, did not advance)

Men's 400 metres
 George Simon
 Round 1 — 47.9 seconds (→ 5th in heat, did not advance)

Men's 800 metres
 Benedict Cayenne
 Heats — 1:48.2 min (→ 2nd in heat, advanced to semi final)
 Semi final — 1:46.8 min (→ 4th in heat, advanced to final)
 Final — 1:54.3 min (→ 8th place)

Men's 4x100 metres relay
 Raymond Fabien, Winston Short, Carl Archer, Edwin Roberts
 Heats — 38.9 seconds (→ 6th in heat, advanced to semi final)
 Semi final — 39.5 seconds (→ 6th in heat, did not advance)

Men's 4x400 metres relay
 George Simon, Euric Bobb, Benedict Cayenne, Edwin Roberts
 Heats — 3:04.5 min (→ 2nd in heat, advanced to semi final)
 Semi final — 39.5 seconds (→ 6th in heat, did not advance)
 Final — 3:04.5 min (→ 6th place)

Cycling

Men's 1.000m Time Trial
 Roger Gibbon — 1:04.66 min (→ 5th place)

Men's Sprint
 Roger Gibbon
 Round 1 — 1st in heat (→ advanced to round 2)
 Round 2 — 1st in heat (→ advanced to round 2)
 Round of 16 — 2nd in heat (→ advanced to repechage)
 Repechage — 2nd in heat (→ did not advance)
 Leslie King
 Round 1 — 2nd in heat (→ advanced to repechage)
 Repechage — 1st in heat (→ advanced to round 2)
 Round 2 — 3rd in heat (→ advanced to repechage)
 Repechage — 1st in heat (→ advanced to round of 16)
 Round of 16 — 2nd in heat (→ advanced to repechage)
 Repechage — 3rd in heat (→ did not advance)

Men's Individual Pursuit
 Vernon Stauble
 Qualification — 5:07.80 min (→ 19th in trial, did not advance)

Men's Team Pursuit
 Robert Farrell, Salim Mohammed, Phillip Richardson, Noel Luces
 Qualification — 4:48.64 min (→ did not advance)

Shooting

Two male shooters represented Trinidad and Tobago in 1968.

50 m pistol
 Bertram Manhin — 539 pts (→ 38th place)

50 m rifle, prone
 Hugh Homer — 583 pts (→ 65th place)

Swimming

Men's 100 metres freestyle
 Geoffrey Ferreira
 Heats — 58.9 s (→ 5th in heat, did not advance)

Men's 100 metres backstroke
 Geoffrey Ferreira
 Heats — DNS (→ no ranking)

Men's 100 metres butterfly
 Geoffrey Ferreira
 Heats — DNS (→ no ranking)

Weightlifting

Lightweight
 Hugo Gittens
 Press — 120.0 kg
 Snatch — 102.5 kg
 Jerk — 137.5 kg
 Total — 360.0 kg (→ 16th place)

References

External links
 Official Olympic Reports
 Part Three: Results

Nations at the 1968 Summer Olympics
1968
1968 in Trinidad and Tobago